Mutair Mutair  is a Kuwaiti football goalkeeper who played for Kuwait in the 1984 Asian Cup.

Honours 

Asian Cup:
Third Place : 1984

References

External links
Stats

Kuwait international footballers
Kuwaiti footballers
1984 AFC Asian Cup players
Living people
Association football goalkeepers
Year of birth missing (living people)
Kuwait Premier League players
Al Jahra SC players